Baulou is a commune in the Ariège department in the Occitanie region of south-western France.

The inhabitants of the commune are known as Baulouais or Baulouaises.

Geography
Baulou is located in the Pre-Pyrenees in the Plauntaurel Mountains and a part of the Parc naturel régional des Pyrénées ariégeoises some 12 km south by south-west of Pamiers and 6 km north-west of Foix. Access to the commune is by the D1 road from Vernajoul in the south-east which passes through the commune and ends in the village. The D11 branches from the D117 south-west of the commune and passes through continuing north-east to Loubens. The D1a branches off the D11 in the commune and goes north-west to Aigues-Juntes. Apart from the village there is the hamlet of Clarac in the commune. The commune is mainly forest with some farmland along the D1 and in scattered parts.

The Ruisseau d'Argentat rises north of the village and flows towards the north-west into a small artificial lake before continuing north-west to join the Lèze north-west of Aigues-Juntes. Many streams feed the left bank of the Ruisseau d'Argentat including the Goute de Chenaut which also forms the north-western border of the commune, the Freyché, the Goute de Tariol, the Goute du Peyfourcat, and the Goute du Gouas. The Ruisseau de Carol flows from the south to the village then continues north to join the Ruisseau de la Plaine north of the commune. The Fajal rises in the north-east of the commune and flows south.

Toponymy
Baulou appears as Boulou on the 1750 Cassini Map and the same on the 1790 version.

History
In 1901, during the building of the Foix - Saint Girons railway a mammoth was discovered and called the "Mammoth of Baulou" by the scientific community. It was displayed in the hall of the Château de Foix departmental museum<ref>[http://www.ladepeche.fr/article/2009/05/20/609304-expo-le-mammouth-de-baulou-renait-de-ses-cendres.html The Mammouth of Baulou restored from its ashes], Stéphane Marcelot, 20 May 2009 </ref> before being transferred to the Parc pyrénéen de l'art préhistorique'' (Pyrenean park of prehistoric art) at Tarascon-sur-Ariège.

Administration

List of Successive Mayors

Demography
In 2017 the commune had 168 inhabitants.

Sites and monuments

The Labouiche Subterranean River

See also
Communes of the Ariège department

References

Communes of Ariège (department)

sr:Болу